= Abdulkadir Mohammed Nasir =

Nigerian politician

Member of the House of Representatives of Nigeria from Katsina State
- In office 2007–2011
- Constituency: Katsina/MalumFashi/Kafur

Personal details
- Citizenship: Nigeria
- Party: People's Democratic Party
- Occupation: Politician

Abdulkadir Mohammed Nasir (born 6 January 1965) is a Nigerian politician who served as a member of the House of Representatives representing Katsina/MalumFashi/Kafur constituencies from 2007 to 2011 under the platform of the People's Democratic Party.

== Appointment ==
Abdulkadir Mohammed Nasir was appointed as the national coordinator for National Social Investment Program (NSIP) by Muhammadu Buhari.
